Patrick Cassidy (born 1887) was an English professional footballer who played as a centre half.

Career
Born in Wallsend, Cassidy played for South Shields, Bradford City. For Bradford City, he made 4 appearances in the Football League. In 1912, Cassidy joined Southern Football League Second Division side Cardiff City, making his debut in a 1–0 victory over Mid Rhondda on 12 September. He helped the side to win the title and promotion to the First Division in his debut season. His defensive partnership with Billy Hardy and Kidder Harvey led the trio to be given the nickname of the "holy three" by the club fans. The emergence of a young Fred Keenor following the end of World War I saw Cassidy come under pressure for his place in the side and, following Keenor's strong performances during pre-season matches prior to 1919–20 season, Cassidy himself pushed for Keenor to be included in the first-team in his place due to his "youth and promise".

Honours
Cardiff City

Southern Football League Second Division winner: 1912–13

Sources

References

1887 births
Year of death missing
English footballers
South Shields F.C. (1889) players
Bradford City A.F.C. players
Cardiff City F.C. players
English Football League players
Association football defenders
Southern Football League players